Bab Mishan-e Bala (also Romanized as Bāb Mīshān-e Bālā) is a village in Sarduiyeh Rural District, Sarduiyeh District, Jiroft County, Kerman Province, Iran. At the 2006 census, its population was 146, in 33 families.

References 

Populated places in Jiroft County